Tōtara Park is a suburb of Upper Hutt, New Zealand, located 2 km northeast of the city centre. It is accessed via the Tōtara Park Bridge which crosses the Hutt River, connecting it to State Highway 2 and the main Upper Hutt urban area. It was popular in the 1970s and 1980s for families moving into the Upper Hutt area.

Most of the streets in Tōtara Park are named after states, towns and cities of the United States, with the main road running through the suburb being California Drive.

Tōtara Park is built on alluvial gravel. The Wellington Fault runs through the suburb—one section of California Drive straddles the fault, and the road lanes are built on either side of the fault with a large central reservation between them. This was designed so houses would be offset at least 20 metres from the fault, hopefully limiting damage if the fault were to rupture.

The Māori names for this area are Te Hau-karetu and for the Hutt River itself; Heretaunga, and Awa Kaiangi. In December 2019, the approved official geographic name of the suburb was gazetted as "Tōtara Park".

Demographics

Totara Park had a population of 2,901 at the 2018 New Zealand census, an increase of 27 people (0.9%) since the 2013 census, and an increase of 48 people (1.7%) since the 2006 census. There were 1,041 households. There were 1,410 males and 1,488 females, giving a sex ratio of 0.95 males per female. The median age was 36.8 years (compared with 37.4 years nationally), with 624 people (21.5%) aged under 15 years, 531 (18.3%) aged 15 to 29, 1,362 (46.9%) aged 30 to 64, and 387 (13.3%) aged 65 or older.

Ethnicities were 87.5% European/Pākehā, 15.4% Māori, 4.3% Pacific peoples, 5.2% Asian, and 2.1% other ethnicities (totals add to more than 100% since people could identify with multiple ethnicities).

The proportion of people born overseas was 17.4%, compared with 27.1% nationally.

Although some people objected to giving their religion, 56.2% had no religion, 32.7% were Christian, 0.6% were Hindu, 0.1% were Muslim, 0.4% were Buddhist and 2.2% had other religions.

Of those at least 15 years old, 318 (14.0%) people had a bachelor or higher degree, and 441 (19.4%) people had no formal qualifications. The median income was $38,700, compared with $31,800 nationally. The employment status of those at least 15 was that 1,269 (55.7%) people were employed full-time, 309 (13.6%) were part-time, and 87 (3.8%) were unemployed.

Points of interest
Tōtara Park was the name for the entire eastern side of the upper valley, due to the Tōtara trees that grew there.

Was the western side to an ornate suspension bridge opened in 1917. Maoribank Bridge, originally being able to carry automobiles and trucks, eventually was used for pedestrians only, and finally collapsing in a medium flood in the early 1990s. A new modern type suspension bridge was then built on the northern side towards Brown Owl.

The river surrounding the original suspension bridge was a popular picnic and swimming spot for the entire region.

Cannon Point Walkway
The walkway is mostly within the Akatarawa Regional Park. It was named for an old fallen tree resembling a cannon that was once there. Walking routes, cycle tracks and logging roads connect Cannon Point to Akatarawa, Moonshine and other areas to the west.

California Park
California Park is a large neighbourhood park including a playground, the Upper Hutt Municipal Brass Band club rooms and open space. The park provides a readily accessible place to see the crush zone of the Wellington Fault.

Transport
Metlink bus route 111 connects Tōtara Park with central Upper Hutt and Upper Hutt Railway Station.

Education

References

Suburbs of Upper Hutt
Populated places on Te Awa Kairangi / Hutt River